Meritt Homer Steger (August 25, 1906 – March 5, 1998) was a United States lawyer who served as General Counsel of the Navy from May 2, 1960 until May 31, 1971.

He was married in 1929; his wife died in 1987. He died of coronary heart disease in Fairfax, Virginia at the age of 91.

References 

General Counsels of the United States Navy
1906 births
1998 deaths
People from Denison, Texas
United States Navy personnel of World War II